Goodrich is an unincorporated community in Hickman County, in the U.S. state of Tennessee.

History
A post office called Goodrich was established in 1884, and remained in operation until it was discontinued in 1933. The community was named for Levin D. Goodrich, a local businessman in the blast furnace industry.

References

Unincorporated communities in Hickman County, Tennessee
Unincorporated communities in Tennessee